LIPB may refer to:
 Lipoyl(octanoyl) transferase, an enzyme
 Bolzano Airport